"Wesh alors" is a song by French rapper Jul released in 2015.

Charts

Weekly charts

Year-end charts

References

2015 songs
French-language songs
2015 singles